"DOTD" may refer to:
Deal of the day
 Louisiana Department of Transportation and Development

In popular culture, "DOTD" may refer to:
Dawn of the Dead (disambiguation)
Dawn of the Dragons (book)
Dawn of the Dragons (video game)
Destiny of the Daleks
Dinner of the day
Day of the Dead
Day of the Dust - Harrowing, traumatizing experience involving chores and yelling circa ~2004
Donkey of the Day, segment on The Breakfast Club (radio show)
Driver of the day, used in Formula 1